The 2012 Volta Limburg Classic was the 39th edition of the Volta Limburg Classic cycle race and was held on 31 March 2012. The race started and finished in Eijsden. The race was won by Pavel Brutt.

General classification

References

2012
2012 in road cycling
2012 in Dutch sport